Miracema is a municipality located in the Rio de Janeiro state's northwestern region, bordering Minas Gerais state, Brazil and with a population of 27,154 inhabitants living in an area of 302.5 km2. Its main economic activities are agriculture and milk production.

History
In the early 20th century, coffee was the city's most important economic activity, and Rio de Janeiro state was the greatest coffee producer of the country.

Sports
Brazilian football manager Aymoré Moreira, and his brothers, Zezé Moreira and Ayrton Moreira, who were also managers, were born in the city. Miracema Futebol Clube is a city's football club.

References

External links
 Miracema City Hall
 Portal do Cidadão - Governo do Estado do Rio de Janeiro

Municipalities in Rio de Janeiro (state)